Principle of equivalence may refer to:

 The relativistic equivalence principle
 Carl Jung's second principle relating to the libido#Analytical psychology

 The principle of nuclear equivalence, in genetics

 Wolfram's principle of computational equivalence, discussed in A New Kind of Science

See also
 Doctrine of cash equivalence